Stephen D. Newman (born January 20, 1943) is an American actor.  In 1983, he appeared opposite Brian Bedford in a Broadway production of Molière's The Misanthrope.  For his performance in The Misanthrope, in which he played Philinte, Newman was nominated for a Drama Desk Award for Outstanding Featured Actor in a Play.  Newman also appeared in the 1982 film Sophie's Choice.

Filmography

References

External links
 
 
 

1943 births
Living people
20th-century American male actors
Male actors from Seattle
American male film actors
American male stage actors